Vanni Lauzana (born 12 February 1961) is an Italian weightlifter. He competed in the men's super heavyweight event at the 1992 Summer Olympics.

References

1961 births
Living people
Italian male weightlifters
Olympic weightlifters of Italy
Weightlifters at the 1992 Summer Olympics
Sportspeople from Friuli-Venezia Giulia
People from the Province of Udine
20th-century Italian people